The iPad Air (3rd generation) (colloquially referred to as iPad Air 3) is a tablet computer developed, and marketed by Apple Inc. It was announced and released on March 18, 2019, alongside the 5th-generation iPad Mini. 

The device was released five years after the previous iPad Air 2, as the iPad (5th generation) was released in 2017 as the successor to the iPad (4th generation) released in 2012. The entry-level iPad lineup continued starting iPad (6th generation) released in 2018, while the third generation iPad Air was positioned as an iPad Air lineup. 

Its case design is identical to the iPad Pro 10.5 inch; internal hardware includes an upgraded Apple A12 Bionic SoC, a 10.5-inch Retina Display, 3GB of LPDDR4X memory, and support for Bluetooth 5.0 and Apple Pencil (first generation).

It was discontinued on September 15, 2020, following the introduction of the iPad Air (4th generation).

Features

Hardware
Available in three color options (including Silver, Space Gray and Gold), the gold color option of the third-generation iPad Air is now updated introduced with the iPhone 8.

It features an upgraded, 7MP front camera (used first in the iPhone 7 and up to the iPhone XS), compared to the 1.2MP camera found in the previous generation. However, it retains the same, older 8MP rear camera which cannot record in 4K video as such. 

It has a 2.49GHz six-core processor, the Apple A12 Bionic chip. That chip has a 66% faster clock speed than the 1.5GHz triple-core Apple A8X in the second-gen. 
It also has a True Tone display, which allows the LCD to adapt to ambient lighting to change its color and intensity in different environments, and P3 wide color gamut to allow the LCD shows more vibrant colors.

This iPad Air retains the Lightning port, keeps the headphone jack, and has a slightly larger battery of 30.2 watt-hours (up from 27.6 W·h), rated by Apple to provide the same "10 hours" of active use. The third-generation iPad Air is the final model to include a home button, Lightning port and headphone jack; the fourth-generation iPad Air does not.

Software

The third-generation iPad Air first shipped with iOS 12.2. In September 2019 it received an iPadOS 13 update. In September 2020, third-generation iPad Air was listed as one of the devices that can be updated to iPadOS 16.

Reception
The third-generation iPad Air received positive reviews. It was praised for its laminated screen, Smart Keyboard case capability, as well as a speedy SoC. However, it only supports the first-generation Apple Pencil, uses the 2017's 10.5-inch iPad Pro design and only has two speakers compared to four on the Pro models. In addition, while the current Pro models provide some support for HDR, the Air 3 does not.

Hardware issues
Some devices of this model, which were manufactured between March 2019 and October 2019, have issues where the screen may flicker or flash before permanently dying. As a result of this Apple released a recall program which allows users to send in their device for replacement up to two years from the date of purchase.
 
2nd generation iPad Pro and 3rd generation iPad Air models can develop a bright white light on the display which is located above the home button.

Timeline

Apple products use the convention 1 GB = one gigabyte (one billion bytes), meaning that 16, 32, 64 and 128 GB storage devices contain a total of 14.9, 29.8, 59.6 and 119.2 GiB, respectively. Formatting and apps take up some of this total storage, leaving 11.5, 27.5, 56.5 and 114 GiB available to the user.

References 

Air 3
iPad (9)
Tablet computers
Touchscreen portable media players
Tablet computers introduced in 2019